Ryan Mishler (born May 23, 1968) is a Republican member of the Indiana Senate, representing the 9th district.

Education
Ryan Mishler is a graduate of the University of Southern California and Worsham College of Mortuary Science.

Senate
Mishler has represented the 9th district in the State Senate since 2004. He serves as Chairman of the Agriculture and Natural Resources committee. He also serves on the Appropriations, Health and Provider Services and the Tax & Fiscal Policy committees. The district includes portions of Kosciusko, Marshall, St. Joseph, and Elkhart counties. He was re-elected in 2008 getting 34,803 votes, ahead of Democrat Mike Settles who received 16,968 votes.

Personal
Mishler serves as  President of Mishler Funeral Homes and the Bremen Monument Company. He is a Methodist.

References

External links
 official Indiana State Legislature site

1968 births
Living people
Indiana state senators
21st-century American politicians
University of Southern California alumni